George Harris Hees  (June 17, 1910 – June 11, 1996) was a Canadian politician and businessman.

Background
Born in Toronto, Hees earned a playboy image during his youth (nicknamed Gorgeous George), but then became a stalwart member of the Progressive Conservative Party of Canada.  He was educated at the exclusive Crescent School in Toronto, Trinity College School in Port Hope, Ontario, the Royal Military College, student #1976 (where he was awarded an honorary Doctor of Military Science in 1986), the University of Toronto, and spent a year at Cambridge University in 1933.

Athlete
He was a noted athlete, winning championships in boxing and lacrosse at Cambridge. As a professional football player he played 3 seasons with the Toronto Argonauts (11 regular season and 3 playoff games) and won the Grey Cup in 1938. While serving during the Second World War, he played in the famed Tea Bowl for the Canadian Army football team against American Army team at White City Stadium in London on February 13, 1944; the Canadians won 16-6.

Military service
He attended The Royal Military College of Canada from 1927 to 1931.  He then attended the University of Toronto and concurrently served for four years with The Royal Grenadiers, a Militia Regiment based in Toronto. He served in the Canadian Army in North-West Europe during the Second World War. During the Battle of the Scheldt, he served as the brigade major of the 5th Canadian Infantry Brigade. On 1 November 1944, he volunteered to take over command of a company of The Calgary Highlanders when all their officers were killed or wounded after crossing the Walcheren Causeway. He was later wounded by a sniper and was repatriated to Canada and discharged.

Politics
After placing second to Liberal candidate David Croll in the Toronto riding of Spadina in the 1945 federal election, he won election to the House of Commons of Canada in a 1950 by-election in the nearby riding of Broadview. He was also President of the Progressive Conservative Party from 1953 to 1956.

When the PCs under John Diefenbaker won government in 1957, Hees was named Minister of Transport, and oversaw the opening of the Saint Lawrence Seaway and the new Halifax International Airport. In 1960, he was appointed Minister of Trade and Commerce. During this period, Hees was regarded as the second most powerful man in the Tory party. However, in 1963, he fell out with Diefenbaker, and became embroiled in the Munsinger Affair and elected to sit out the 1963 election. In that election, the Liberals replaced the Tories' minority government with one of their own, causing Diefenbaker's succession with Lester B. Pearson as prime minister.

Hees considered leaving the Conservatives for the Liberals, but did not do so. He became president of the Montreal Stock Exchange. He returned to Parliament in the 1965 election as a PC, defeating Liberal MP Pauline Jewett in the rural riding of Northumberland, and remained in the front rows of the opposition ranks for almost two decades.

He ran for the leadership of the PC Party at its 1967 leadership convention, and placed fourth in a field of eleven on the first ballot. He remained for two further ballots before withdrawing, and supporting the eventual winner, Nova Scotia Premier Robert Stanfield.

He was noted as being involved in a memorable case of battery, in which he forcefully ejected a campaign worker from his room, striking his head against the door. Hees tried to plead self-defence, which failed due to the lack of imminent harm anticipated by him (MacDonald v. Hees (1974), 46 D.L.R. (3d) (N.S.T.D.)).

He was not named to Cabinet during the Joe Clark government in 1979–80, and was quoted saying, as Clark stepped down in the 1983 leadership race, "We've got him! We've got the S.O.B."

In 1981, Hees was the Chairman of the Canada-US Permanent Joint Board on Defence. In this role, he was the first Canadian to bring to the attention of then-Prime Minister Pierre Trudeau the US request to test nuclear-capable cruise missiles over Canadian territory.

When Brian Mulroney led the party to a majority government in 1984, Hees was named Minister of Veterans Affairs. Hees retired from politics at the 1988 Canadian federal election. In 1989 he was made an Officer of the Order of Canada.

There is a veterans wing at Toronto's Sunnybrook Health Sciences Centre bearing his name, and near the relocated Crescent School he attended as a child.

Election results (partial)

In popular culture
Hees was portrayed by Christopher Plummer in the 1997 TV miniseries The Arrow.

References

External links
 
 

1910 births
1996 deaths
Canadian Anglicans
Canadian Ministers of Transport
Members of the 18th Canadian Ministry
Members of the 24th Canadian Ministry
Members of the House of Commons of Canada from Ontario
Members of the King's Privy Council for Canada
Officers of the Order of Canada
Politicians from Toronto
Progressive Conservative Party of Canada MPs
Royal Military College of Canada alumni
Canadian football people from Toronto
Toronto Argonauts players
University of Toronto alumni
Canadian sportsperson-politicians
Players of Canadian football from Ontario
Progressive Conservative Party of Canada leadership candidates